Petri Koskinen (born April 28, 1983) is a Finnish ice hockey player who currently plays professionally in Finland for SaiPa of the SM-liiga.

References

External links

1983 births
Living people
Finnish ice hockey forwards
Mikkelin Jukurit players
Lahti Pelicans players
SaiPa players
Tappara players
Ice hockey people from Tampere